Bobby Kildea is a musician from Northern Ireland. He plays bass and guitar in the Scottish indie pop band Belle & Sebastian, after joining in 2001 to replace departing bassist Stuart David, and had previously been in V-Twin.

In December 2008, he toured with The Vaselines during Belle & Sebastian's hiatus, during which Stuart Murdoch was heading his God Help the Girl project.

Bobby features alongside Belle and Sebastian co-star Stevie Jackson on the 2011 album 'Fuerteventura' by Spanish artist Russian Red

References 

Belle and Sebastian members
Bass guitarists from Northern Ireland
Living people
People educated at Sullivan Upper School
British indie pop musicians
The Vaselines members
21st-century bass guitarists
Year of birth missing (living people)
People from Bangor, County Down